Heni Village is a settlement in Kenya's Central Province. It is located in Njambini District, Magumu Location and Karati sub-location

References 

Populated places in Central Province (Kenya)